Being Somebody is the second studio album by English-Irish pop vocal group Liberty X. It was released on 3 November 2003 via V2 Records. The album was released a year-and-a-half after their debut release, Thinking It Over. The album peaked at number 12 on the UK Albums Chart, selling around 75,000 copies in its first week of release.

Background
The band returned to the studio shortly after the release of their debut effort, Thinking It Over, and began by recording a collaboration with producer Richard X – a mash-up of classic tracks "Being Boiled" and "Ain't Nobody", entitled "Being Nobody". As well as being released to promote the band's new album, it also served as the lead single from Richard X Presents His X-Factor Vol. 1. For their second studio effort, the band teamed up with producers Lucas Secon and Mike Peden, as well as allowing band member Tony Lundon to produce three tracks, one of which he solely wrote. "Being Nobody" was released as the album's lead single on 24 March 2003. "Jumpin", a track produced and co-written by Secon, was released as the album's second single over six months later, on 12 October 2003.

The album was released in Japan a week later on 18 October. The Japanese edition of the album features an alternative, white picture cover, and includes three additional tracks – "Just a Little", as the track remained previously unreleased in Japan, brand new Japanese exclusive track "Willing to Try" and "Fresh", a collaboration with Kool & The Gang, recorded for their compilation album, The Hits: Reloaded. "Everybody Cries" was released as the album's third single on 12 January 2004. "Fresh" was later released as a single on 14 April 2004, exclusively in France, Germany and Spain, while "I'll Be Remembering" was planned as the equivalent single release in the United Kingdom, however, by this time, the band's record contract with V2 Records had been terminated, and the single's release was cancelled, leaving "Fresh" as an internationally exclusive single.

The Japanese version of Being Somebody also uses an alternative version of the track "Whatcha Doin' Tonight", which also carries a slightly different title, "(Tell Me) What You're Doing Tonight". This version was originally recorded during the recording sessions for Thinking It Over. Four songs that failed to make the final cut of Being Somebody, "Bump & Grind", "Get Away", "Press Rewind" and "Wilder", were leaked to YouTube in April 2010. These tracks were also reportedly being considered for inclusion on the band's third V2 project, before they were dropped from the label. Several additional tracks from the album sessions were also released as B-sides: "Enemy", "Sunshine", "It Helps" and "Shake It".

Critical reception

Simon Evans, writing for musicOMH, felt that Being Somebody "proves there’s still plenty of gas in the tank" for the band. He noted that while it kicks "off with a rather cheesy and unnecessary intro, the album moves straight into high gear with the monster hit singles, "Jumpin’" and "Being Nobody," and rarely lets the pace flag throughout the remaining 13 tracks," resulting "in some of the most memorable pop tunes you are ever likely to hear." Dave Simpson from The Guardian remarked that the album displays "increasingly slick R&B." He added that "it's no coincidence that Being Somebodys big hitters are penned by the seasoned pros and the endless tales of lurve provide few glimpses into the ordinary people at the heart of the phenomenon. Still, the girls' vocal performances are integral, and the band's Tony Lundon is playing an increasingly major writing role: his untypical "Watcha Doin' Tonite" hardly pines for lives they've now clearly left behind."

Allmusic editor Jon O'Brien found that "while half of the album is bursting with ideas, the other half seems stuck in a rut as several samey, watered-down R&B tracks start to merge into one another and the likes of "Jumpin'," a live favorite on their 2003 tour, gets lost amidst "everything but the kitchen sink" over-production. Being Somebody will certainly establish their credentials as songwriters, having penned ten of the tracks here, but they certainly need reining in a little for album number three if they're going to fulfill their early potential." Similarly, Denise Boyd from BBC Music wrote that Being Somebody "feels something of a mish-mash. Liberty X are still not clear on what direction they are heading and this uncertainty weakens the album. The quintets strength lies in their R&B influenced up-tempo tracks and soulful ballads. This is the area they should concentrate on [...] With this, Liberty X has broken the mould of the manufactured pop group. They have answered their critics and have shown once and for all that they truly deserve the title Popstars."

Track listing

Notes
 denotes co-producer

Charts

Certifications

Release history

References

Liberty X albums
2003 albums
V2 Records albums
Albums produced by Richard X
Albums produced by Mike Peden